Pavel Mikhailovich Malikov (born 26 February 1986) is a Russian professional boxer who held the WBA Asia, WBC-ABC, and WBO Inter-Continental lightweight titles between 2016 and 2018.

Career
On 9 July 2017, Pavel Malikov faced Japanese veteran Daiki Kaneko. He defeated Kaneko by split decision to retain the WBA Asia lightweight title.

On 15 December, Malikov defended his WBA Asia title against Colombian boxer Deiner Berrio for the vacant WBO interim Inter-Continental title. He defeated Berrio by split decision in a competitive fight to add the WBO interim title to his collection.

On 22 April 2018, Malikov defended the full WBO Inter-Continental title against Daud Yordan in a WBA world title eliminator. In what is an upset performance, Yordan defeated Malikov by knockout in the eighth round.

Professional boxing record

References

External links

1986 births
Living people
Russian male boxers
Lightweight boxers
Sportspeople from Moscow